Longicaudus is a genus of true bugs belonging to the family Aphididae.

The species of this genus are found in Europe and Northern America.

Species:
 Longicaudus cornutus Chakrabarti, Samiran & Banerjee, 1991 
 Longicaudus dunlopi Hille Ris Lambers, 1965

References

Aphididae